Below is a list of National Amateur Boxing Light Middleweight Champions, also known as United States Amateur Champions, along with the state or region which they represented.  This category was recently discontinued.  The United States National Boxing Championships bestow the title of United States Amateur Champion on amateur boxers for winning the annual national amateur boxing tournament organized by USA Boxing, the national governing body for Olympic boxing and is the United States' member organization of the International Amateur Boxing Association (AIBA).  It is one of four premier amateur boxing tournaments, the others being the National Golden Gloves Tournament, which crowned its own amateur light middleweight champion, the Police Athletic League Tournament, and the United States Armed Forces Tournament, all sending champions to the US Olympic Trials.  

1952 - Tony Anthony, New York, New York
1953 - William Collins, Springville, New York
1954 - John Houston, Oakland, California
1955 - Frank Davis, Air Force
1956 - Frank Davis, Air Force
1957 - Denny Moyer, Portland, OR
1958 - Denny Moyer, Portland, OR
1959 - Wilbert McClure, Toledo, Ohio
1960 - Wilbert McClure, Toledo, Ohio
1961 - Bobby Pasquale, Tacoma, WA
1962 - Roy McMillan, Toledo, Ohio
1963 - Johnny Howard, Portland, OR
1964 - Tolman Gibson, Spokane, WA
1965 - C. Williams, Homestead, Pennsylvania
1966 - Johnny Howard, Portland, OR
1967 - Arthur Davis, Air Force
1968 - William Beeler, Louisville. Kentucky
1969 - Larry Carlisle, Marines
1970 - Jesse Valdez, Air Force
1971 - Billy Daniels, Norfolk, Virginia
1972 - Henry Johnson, Indianapolis, Indiana
1973 - Dale Grant, Tacoma, WA
1974 - Jerome Bennett, Air Force
1975 - Charles Walker, Mesa, Arizona
1976 - J.B. Williamson, Marines
1977 - Clint Jackson, Nashville, Tennessee
1978 - J.B. Williamson, Marines
1979 - Jeff Stoudemire, Cleveland, Ohio
1980 - Donald Bowers, Jackson, Tennessee
1981 - James Rayford, Navy
1982 - Dennis Milton, Bronx, New York (won both spring and winter titles)
1983 - Frank Tate, Detroit, Michigan
1984 - Kevin Bryant, Army
1985 - Tim Littles, Flint, Michigan
1986 - Michael Moorer, Monessen, Pennsylvania
1987 - Gerald McClellan, Freeport, Illinois
1988 - Frankie Liles, Syracuse, New York
1989 - Chris Byrd, Flint, Michigan
1990 - Paul Vaden, Puyallup, WA
1991 - Raúl Márquez, Houston, Texas
1992 - Robert Allen, Marines
1993 - Wayne Blair, Miami, Florida
1994 - Jesse Aquino, Kansas City, Missouri
1995 - Jeffrey Clark, Fort Bragg, North Carolina
1996 - David Reid, Philadelphia, Pennsylvania
1997 - Darnell Wilson, Lafayette, Indiana
1998 - Darnell Wilson, Lafayette, Indiana
1999 - Darnell Wilson, Lafayette, Indiana
2000 - Anthony Hanshaw, Mansfield, Ohio
2001 - Sechew Powell, Brooklyn, New York
2002 - Jesús González, Glendale, Arizona
Discontinued

Light middle